The Guerrero mass graves was a multihomicide of more than 55 people found in June 2010 in Taxco, Guerrero, Mexico. Officials of the state of Guerrero speculate that the mass graves where the bodies were found may hold up to 100 corpses.

The mass murder was reportedly carried out by members of the Mexican drug cartels that operate in the state.

See also
List of massacres in Mexico
Mexican Drug War
2011 San Fernando massacre
2011 Durango Massacres
Coahuila mass graves

References

Massacres in Mexico
Organized crime events in Mexico
Mass murder in 2010
Battles of the Mexican drug war
Guerrero
2010 murders in Mexico